Events in the year 1982 in the Republic of India.

Incumbents
 President of India – Neelam Sanjiva Reddy until 25 July, Zail Singh
 Prime Minister of India – Indira Gandhi
 Chief Justice of India – Yeshwant Vishnu Chandrachud

Governors
 Andhra Pradesh – K. C. Abraham 
 Assam – Prakash Mehrotra 
 Bihar – Akhlaqur Rahman Kidwai 
 Gujarat – Sharda Mukherjee 
 Haryana – Ganpatrao Devji Tapase 
 Himachal Pradesh – A. K. Banerjee 
 Jammu and Kashmir – B. K. Nehru 
 Karnataka – Govind Narain (until 15 April), Ashoknath Banerji (starting 15 April)
 Kerala – Jothi Venkatachalam (until 27 October), P. Ramachandran (starting 27 October)
 Madhya Pradesh – B. D. Sharma
 Maharashtra – O. P. Mehra (until 5 March), Idris Hasan Latif (starting 5 March)
 Manipur – S. M. H. Burney 
 Meghalaya – Prakash Mehrotra 
 Nagaland – S. M. H. Burney 
 Odisha – 
 until 24 June: Cheppudira Muthana Poonacha 
 25 June-31 August: Ranganath Misra
 starting 1 September: Cheppudira Muthana Poonacha
 Punjab – Aminuddin Ahmad Khan (until 21 April), Marri Chenna Reddy (starting 21 April) 
 Rajasthan – K. D. Sharma (until 6 March), Om Prakash Mehra (starting 6 March)
 Sikkim – Homi J. H. Taleyarkhan 
 Tamil Nadu – Sadiq Ali (until 6 September), Sundar Lal Khurana (starting 6 September)
 Tripura – S. M. H. Burney 
 Uttar Pradesh – Chandeshwar Prasad Narayan Singh 
 West Bengal – Bhairab Dutt Pande

Events
 National income - 1,932,546 million
 March 5 - Gonda Encounter.
 April – INSAT-1A launched; deactivated in September.
 April 7 - Charan Singh announces retirement from active politics.
 April 25 - Doordarshan begins testing of Color television broadcast in India.
 April 30 - Bijon Setu massacre seventeen Ananda Margis were set ablaze at Bijon Setu in Dhakuria in south Kolkata. No one has been convicted of the murders.
 July 12 – NABARD established through act of Parliament following B. Sivaraman Committee recommendation.
 September 1 - Vypeen alcohol poisonings.

Law

Sport
19 November – 4 December – 9th Asian Games held in Delhi.

Births
15 January – Neil Nitin Mukesh, actor.
15 February  Meera Jasmine, actress. 
28 March  Sonia Agarwal, actress.
8 April  Allu Arjun, actor
28 April – Koyel Mullick, actress
24 May – Kanchi Kaul, actress
12 June – Shailaja Pujari, weightlifter
30 June – Allari Naresh, actor
3 July – Kanika Subramaniam, actress
18 July – Priyanka Chopra, actress, Miss World 2000.
8 August  Fahadh Faasil, actor.
28 August – Prasanna, actor
11 September – Shriya Saran, actress
28 September – Ranbir Kapoor, actor
16 October – Prithviraj Sukumaran actor
1 March – Mary Kom, boxer
21 November – Aarti Chhabria, actress and model
8 December  Pa. Ranjith, film director.

Deaths
11 January – Manya Surve, Indian urban dacoit and gangster in the Mumbai underworld (born 1944).
3 August – Tribhuvan Narain Singh, Chief Minister of Uttar Pradesh (born 1904).
2 October – C.D. Deshmukh, Minister of Finance and first Governor of the Reserve bank of India (b.1896)
15 November – Vinoba Bhave, freedom fighter and teacher (born 1895).

Full date unknown
Firaq Gorakhpuri, poet (born 1896).

See also 
 List of Bollywood films of 1982

References

 
Years of the 20th century in India